Simone Thust (born 22 September 1971) is a retired female race walker from Germany.

Achievements

References

1971 births
Living people
German female racewalkers